The Royal New Zealand Show, first held in 1924, is an annual agricultural show held by the Royal Agricultural Society of New Zealand, an umbrella organization for agricultural and pastoral associations in New Zealand.  The show was formerly held in rotation at Palmerston North, Hawke's Bay, Hamilton, Invercargill and Christchurch.  Starting in 2006, the show was hosted by the Canterbury Agricultural and Pastoral Association at the Canterbury Agricultural Park in Christchurch; this ended after the 2010 show.

See also 
Agricultural show
Agriculture in New Zealand

References

External links
 Royal Agricultural Society of New Zealand - The Royal New Zealand Show

Tourist attractions in Canterbury, New Zealand
Agricultural shows in New Zealand
Recurring events established in 1924
Festivals established in 1924
Organisations based in New Zealand with royal patronage